Liberal Democracy of Slovenia (LDS) is a social-liberal political party in Slovenia. Between 1992 and 2004 it was the largest (and ruling) party in the country. In the 2011 Slovenian parliamentary election, it failed to win entry to the Slovenian National Assembly. The party was a member of the Liberal International and the Alliance of Liberals and Democrats for Europe.

The LDS dominated Slovenian politics during the first decade following independence. Except for a brief interruption in 2000, it held the parliamentary majority between 1994 and 2004, when it lost the election to the conservative Slovenian Democratic Party. The loss was followed by decline, infighting and political fragmentation. In the runup to the 2008 parliamentary election the LDS joined in an unofficial coalition with the Social Democrats and Zares, but lost nearly 80% of its seats, dropping from 23 to just 5 and becoming the smallest parliamentary party. In the 2011 parliamentary election on 4 December 2011, its support collapsed even further: it won only 1.48% of the vote, not reaching the parliamentary threshold of 4%.

History

In 1990, the well-known Slovenian sociologist, philosopher and cultural critic Slavoj Žižek was the LDS' candidate for the Presidency of Slovenia (an auxiliary body of the President of the Republic, abolished in 1992).

The LDS formed coalitions ruling the governments of Slovenia from 1992 to 2004, with an interruption for a few months in 2000. The first Prime Minister of Slovenia from LDS was Janez Drnovšek, who later became the President of Slovenia in 2002 and was succeeded by Anton Rop, former Finance Minister.

At the 2004 European election, LDS won 21.9% of the vote, which yielded 2 seats in the European Parliament out of Slovenia's allocation of 7. At the 2004 elections, the LDS party suffered a considerable loss of votes. The Slovenian Democratic Party became the largest party, and the LDS went into opposition. The party held 23 seats (22.8% votes) in the National Assembly until 2007, when 12 members resigned from the party.

Following the defeat of 2004, the party suffered a severe internal crisis. In 2005, Anton Rop resigned as president and was succeeded by Jelko Kacin. Two years later, a group led by Matej Lahovnik and the former Secretary General of the party Gregor Golobič left the LDS and founded a new social liberal political party called Zares, while several other prominent members left for the Social Democrats, including the former Prime Minister Anton Rop. Following these events, Jelko Kacin resigned as President and was succeeded by Katarina Kresal. Following Kresal's election as president, several other prominent members, including former Health Minister Dušan Keber, decided to leave the party as well.

In 2008, the party won 5,3% of the votes and entered the centre-left coalition led by the Social Democrat Borut Pahor, with two ministers in the government. In the early elections of 2011, the party failed to enter the Parliament.

In 2022 Slovenian Presidential Elections the party endorsed Ivo Vajgl, their former member.

Parliamentary representation

Prominent members
Presidents
Jožef Školč (1990−1992)
Janez Drnovšek (1992−2002)
Anton Rop (2002−2005)
Jelko Kacin (2005−2007)
Katarina Kresal (2007−2011)
Iztok Podbregar (2012−2013)
Tone Anderlič (2013−Present)

Other prominent members
Mojca Drčar Murko
Jože Pirjevec

Other prominent former members
Igor Bavčar
Alenka Bratušek
Jože Dežman
Gregor Golobič
Dimitrij Rupel
Ivo Vajgl
Slavko Ziherl
Slavoj Žižek

Electoral results

Parliament

See also
List of liberal parties
Liberalism in Slovenia

References

External links
Liberal Democracy of Slovenia Official site

1994 establishments in Slovenia
Liberal parties in Slovenia
Organizations based in Ljubljana
Political parties established in 1994
Pro-European political parties in Slovenia